Khutseyevka is a rural locality (a selo) in Yasnopolyansky Selsoviet, Kizlyarsky District, Republic of Dagestan, Russia. The population was 944 as of 2010. There are 6 streets.

Geography 
Khutseyevka is located 12 km northeast of Kizlyar (the district's administrative centre) by road. Dalneye and Proletarskoye are the nearest rural localities.

Nationalities 
Avars, Russians, Nogais, Dargins, Laks and Chechens live there.

References 

Rural localities in Kizlyarsky District